Earle Mosley (born December 20, 1946) is a former American football coach who most recently was the running backs coach for the New York Sentinels of the United Football League.

References

External links
United Football League bio

1946 births
Living people
People from Darby, Pennsylvania
Stanford Cardinal football coaches
Notre Dame Fighting Irish football coaches
Chicago Bears coaches
Kansas Jayhawks football coaches
New York Sentinels coaches